The Division of Bass is an Australian electoral division in Tasmania.

Geography
Since 1984, federal electoral division boundaries in Australia have been determined at redistributions by a redistribution committee appointed by the Australian Electoral Commission. Redistributions occur for the boundaries of divisions in a particular state, and they occur every seven years, or sooner if a state's representation entitlement changes or when divisions of a state are malapportioned.

History

The division was one of the five established when the former Division of Tasmania was redistributed on 2 October 1903 and is named for the explorer George Bass. It has always been based on the city of Launceston and surrounding rural areas, and its boundaries have changed very little in the century since its creation. For most of its history it has been a marginal seat, changing hands between the Australian Labor Party and the conservative parties—since 1949 the Liberal Party. Its most notable member has been Lance Barnard, who was Deputy Prime Minister in the Whitlam Government. His resignation in 1975 was followed by Labor's heavy defeat in the Bass by-election, which is seen as the beginning of the end of the Whitlam government.

The Liberals won the seat at the 2019 election.

Bass has had the most different members of any federal electorate at seventeen.

Bass is currently the Coalition's 5th most marginal electorate, held by a 1.43% margin on the two-party-preferred vote.

Members

Election results

References

External links
 Division of Bass - Australian Electoral Commission

Electoral divisions of Australia
Constituencies established in 1903
1903 establishments in Australia
North East Tasmania